The enzyme adenosylmethionine decarboxylase catalyzes the conversion of S-adenosyl methionine to S-adenosylmethioninamine.
Polyamines such as spermidine and spermine are essential for cellular growth under most conditions, being implicated in many cellular processes including DNA, RNA and protein synthesis. S-adenosylmethionine decarboxylase (AdoMetDC) plays an essential regulatory role in the polyamine biosynthetic pathway by generating the n-propylamine residue required for the synthesis of spermidine and spermine from putrescein. Unlike many amino acid decarboxylases AdoMetDC uses a covalently bound pyruvate residue as a cofactor rather than the more common pyridoxal 5'-phosphate. These proteins can be divided into two main groups which show little sequence similarity either to each other, or to other pyruvoyl-dependent amino acid decarboxylases: class I enzymes found in bacteria and archaea, and class II enzymes found in eukaryotes. In both groups the active enzyme is generated by the post-translational autocatalytic cleavage of a precursor protein. This cleavage generates the pyruvate precursor from an internal serine residue and results in the formation of two non-identical subunits termed alpha and beta which form the active enzyme.

References

External links 
 Reaction: R00178

Protein families
EC 4.1.1